The 2004 Sky Bet World Grand Prix was the seventh staging of the World Grand Prix darts tournament, organised by the Professional Darts Corporation. It was held at the Citywest Hotel in Dublin, Ireland, between 18–24 October 2004.

The first round saw the finalists for the previous two years, Phil Taylor and John Part, get knocked out, Taylor losing to Andy Callaby and Part to Ronnie Baxter. The final was contested between Colin Lloyd and 2001 champion Alan Warriner, with Lloyd winning 7-3.

Prize money

Seeds

Draw

References

World Grand Prix (darts)
World Grand Prix Darts